Maurice Peter Kagimu Kiwanuka is a politician, in Uganda. He is the son of the former Chief Justice the late Benedicto Kiwanuka. He was a Member of Parliament of Bukomansimbi constituency in Masaka district. This was before Kalungu District, Lwengo District, and Bukomansimbi District were peeled off of the old Masaka District.

Background and education 
Kagimu was born on 22 September 1961, at Nakesero hospital in Kampala, Uganda, to late Benedicto Kiwanuka and  Maxensia Zalwango as the 8th born. He attended Mugwanya Preparatory School Kabojja in 1967 from Primary One to Primary Four. However, he  completed his Primary Leaving Examinations at Savio Junior School, Kisubi in 1971.

He was admitted to Nyenga Minor Seminary in 1974, in Buikwe District from Senior One to Senior Two, and  later joined Kisubi Seminary for Senior Three and Senior Four. He joined St. Henry’s College Kitovu in 1978, due to the Liberation war in 1979, and spent only one year there and later joined St. Mary’s College Kisubi for Senior Six.

After his A-level education, Kagimu lost his priesthood vocation and instead studied at Makerere University, graduating with a Bachelor’s degree in Economics (1980 to 1983) and a Bachelor’s degree in Philosophy from Urbanian University, Rome in Italy (1984 to 1987). He also holds a Master's degree in Business Administration from the University of Liverpool, U.K.

Career 
After leaving Makerere University, he was employed at Bank of Uganda as a banking officer in the foreign exchange section and in National Housing and Construction Corporation as an administrative officer and later returned to priesthood as a vocation. He later joined  the Verona Missionaries congregation based in Gulu District where he saw the emergence of rebel Joseph Kony and his first ever attack in the area while at Alokolum Major Seminary in 1987. In 1989, Kagimu joined active politics. He won the Constituent Assembly seat for Bukomansimbi County and joined other Ugandans in writing Uganda’s new Constitution In 2002 to 2006, he was the Member of Parliament in the Ugandan Parliament to represent Bukomansimbi Constituency. He served as the Minister of State of Economic Monitoring at the Monitoring, Office of the President from 2001 to 2006.

He served as Uganda’s ambassador to Switzerland and Permanent Representative of Uganda to the United Nations, World Trade Organisation, and other international organizations based in Geneva. He served as Uganda’s High Commissioner up to January 2016 when he was posted from Switzerland to Nigeria.

References

Ugandan diplomats
Makerere University alumni
Alumni of the University of Liverpool
Members of the Parliament of Uganda

1961 births

Living people